Uglow is a surname. Notable people with the surname include:

George Uglow Pope (1820–1908), Christian missionary to Tamil Nadu, translator of Tamil texts into English
Alan Uglow (1941–2011), English-born abstract painter
Euan Uglow (1932–2000), British painter
Jenny Uglow OBE (born 1947), British biographer, critic and publisher
Nikita Uglow (born 1993), Russian sprinter
William James Uglow Woolcock (1878–1947), Liberal Party politician in England

See also
Glow (disambiguation)
Hugh Low